The Harrison Court Apartments is a building complex located in downtown Portland, Oregon, listed on the National Register of Historic Places.

See also
 National Register of Historic Places listings in Southwest Portland, Oregon

References

External links
 

1905 establishments in Oregon
Colonial Revival architecture in Oregon
Residential buildings completed in 1905
Apartment buildings on the National Register of Historic Places in Portland, Oregon
Southwest Portland, Oregon